Batopedina is a genus of flowering plants in the family Rubiaceae. It was described by Bernard Verdcourt in 1953. The genus is found in Burkina Faso, Ghana, D.R.Congo, and Zambia.

Species
 Batopedina linearifolia (Bremek.) Verdc.
Batopedina linearifolia var. glabra E.M.A.Petit - D.R.Congo
Batopedina linearifolia var. linearifolia - Zambia
 Batopedina pulvinellata Robbr.
Batopedina pulvinellata subsp. glabrifolia Robbr. - D.R.Congo
Batopedina pulvinellata subsp. pulvinellata - D.R.Congo
 Batopedina tenuis (A.Chev. ex Hutch. & Dalziel) Verdc. - Burkina Faso, Ghana

References

External links
Batopedina in the World Checklist of Rubiaceae

Rubiaceae genera
Knoxieae
Flora of Africa